London & Associated Properties is a property corporation listed on the London Stock Exchange. It owns 42% of Bisichi Mining.

Operations
King Edward Court, Windsor, Berkshire
Kings Square, West Bromwich
Market Row, Brixton, London
Orchard Square, Sheffield

References

Property companies based in London
Companies based in the City of Westminster
Mayfair
Companies listed on the London Stock Exchange